Garrett House, also known as the Garrett Residence, in Syracuse, New York, was built in 1913.  Along with other Ward Wellington Ward-designed homes, it was listed on the National Register of Historic Places in 1997.

It is listed for its architecture.  The most distinctive feature on the outside of the house was that its roof was made to look like an English Cottage thatched roof.  As can be seen in the photos taken in January, 2009, the roof has been covered with modern asphalt shingles and the house sported a "For Sale by Owner" sign.  The Mercer fireplace in the first floor living room, customary in Ward Wellington Ward houses, is an exceptionally impressive one depicting St. George and the Dragon.

In January 2011, the Garrett House was purchased by a private buyer and is currently in the beginning stages of being restored

The 2021 book Wayward by author Dana Spiotta features the house prominently in the story.

References

Houses in Syracuse, New York
National Register of Historic Places in Syracuse, New York
Houses on the National Register of Historic Places in New York (state)
Houses completed in 1913